Kohanabad District is a district (bakhsh) in Aradan County, Semnan Province, Iran. At the 2006 census, its population was 4,745, in 1,392 families.  The District has one city Kohanabad. The District has two rural districts (dehestan): Faravan Rural District and Kohanabad Rural District. The District was established in 2011, along with Aradan County.

References 

Districts of Semnan Province
Aradan County
2011 establishments in Iran